Itzhak "Itzik" Azuz (born 30 November 1985) is an Israeli former football right back who played in Bnei Yehuda Tel Aviv for 18 years.

Honours

Club
Bnei Yehuda
Israel State Cup (2): 2016–17, 2018–19

Career statistics 

Europa League : 14 Apps

External links
Profile on uefa.com

Living people
1985 births
Israeli footballers
Bnei Yehuda Tel Aviv F.C. players
Israeli Premier League players
Liga Leumit players
Footballers from Tel Aviv
Association football fullbacks